The North Fork of the Humboldt River is an approximately  long tributary of the Humboldt River in northern Elko County, Nevada.

Course
The river has its headwaters on the north slopes of McAfee Peak in the Independence Mountains of northeastern Nevada. Making a sharp bend to the east, it flows through a small gorge called Devil's Gap and then combines with Beaver Creek before resuming its southward course.

History
The North Fork watershed is remote. Some mining activity in the area took place in about 1870, followed by cattle ranching and later sheep ranching in the 1890s. Problems of overgrazing and erosion in the Independence Mountains, which form the headwaters of the North Fork, prompted the federal government to establish the Independence Forest Reserve in 1906. This reserve has since been incorporated into the Mountain City Ranger District of the Humboldt-Toiyabe National Forest.

References

External links

Tributaries of the Humboldt River
Rivers of Elko County, Nevada
Rivers of Nevada
Humboldt–Toiyabe National Forest